Vitalii Oleksandrovych Kim (born 13 March 1981) is a Ukrainian businessman and politician of Korean origin, who has been the Governor of Mykolaiv Oblast since 2020. He is also head of the Mykolayiv Regional Military Administration.

Biography
Vitalii Oleksandrovych Kim was born on 13 March 1981 in Mykolaiv. His father, Oleksandr, is an honored basketball coach of Koryo-saram ancestry, and was a player on the Soviet Union youth team.

Kim graduated from the Mykolaiv Gymnasium No. 2 and the Admiral Makarov National University of Shipbuilding with a degree in enterprise economics.

In 1998, he began to engage in entrepreneurial activity. He was the managing partner of the Ushuaja entertainment complex.

In 2003, he worked for the Ukrpromresurs company, which was engaged in public sector auditing. From 2005 to 2011 he managed a number of enterprises in Mykolaiv, was engaged in international investments. From 2015 to 2016, he headed the analytical department of the Ministry of Agrarian Policy of Ukraine. He is also a founder of a group of development companies, engaged in the construction of residential complexes "Orange", "Concert" and "Uyutny".

Political activity

In 2019, he was a volunteer of the Mykolaiv branch of the Servant of the People party in the presidential and parliamentary elections. During the local elections of 2020, he was a candidate for deputies of the Mykolaiv city council from Servant of the People under No. 2, while remaining non-partisan. Kim was also the head of the party's election headquarters and campaigned for the city and regional councils.

On 25 November 2020, President of Ukraine Volodymyr Zelenskyy appointed Kim governor of Mykolaiv Oblast.

During the 2022 Russian invasion of Ukraine, Kim's role as governor of Mykolaiv Oblast made him prominent as Mykolaiv faced an ultimately-unsuccessful attack from Russian forces. Regarded by western sources such as The Economist as a charismatic leader, he has held daily video updates of the oblast's situation, which have garnered a following and established him as a popular figure across Ukraine due to his wit and mockery of the Russian Army. On 29 March 2022, his office was hit by a Russian missile in an airstrike, killing at least 37 people.

Personal life

Family
He is married to Yuliya Vitalivna Kim, and is raising three children. They have two daughters, Yevheniya and Oleksandra, and one son, Ruslan.

In addition to Ukrainian, Kim speaks Russian and English, in addition to some French and Korean, the latter owing to his Koryo-saram ancestry.

Health

On 9 December 2020, Kim stated that his wife may have contracted COVID-19 and went into self-isolation.

References

1981 births
Living people
Governors of Mykolaiv Oblast
Politicians from Mykolaiv
Servant of the People (political party) politicians
Ukrainian politicians of Korean descent
People of the 2022 Russian invasion of Ukraine
Koryo-saram